TESIS Aviation Enterprise was a cargo airline based in Moscow, Russia. It operated domestic and international charter cargo flights from Moscow to destinations including China, India, United Arab Emirates and Turkey. It also flies passenger charters around the world. It was established and started operations in November 1992. Its main bases were Domodedovo International Airport, Moscow and Irkutsk Airport. The Russian aviation authority is suspending flights effective 17 October 2008. The airline has not been taken over by Russian aviation fuel supplier TOAP that has blamed the credit crisis for the failure of the plan. It has then suspended operations with its two remaining B747-200F freighters on October 17, 2008.

Destinations 
As of August 2007, TESIS Aviation Enterprise operated scheduled cargo flights to the following destinations:

China
Beijing
Nanjing
Shenyang
Shijiazhuang
Tianjin
Germany
Frankfurt-Hahn Airport
Leipzig
Russia
Kemerovo
Moscow (Sheremetyevo International Airport) base
Novosibirsk
Saint Petersburg

Fleet 

The TESIS fleet consisted of the following aircraft (at August 2006):

1 Ilyushin Il-62M
9 Ilyushin Il-76TD
2 Tupolev Tu-154B
3 Boeing 747-200F

References

External links 

 TESIS Aviation Enterprise 
 TESIS Aviation Enterprise fleet

Defunct airlines of Russia
Airlines established in 1992
Airlines disestablished in 2008
Defunct cargo airlines
Companies based in Moscow